Kuzguncuk is a neighborhood in the Üsküdar district on the Asian side of the Bosphorus in Istanbul, Turkey. The neighborhood is centered on a valley opening to the Bosphorus and is somewhat isolated from the main part of the city, being  surrounded by nature preserves, cemeteries, and a military installation. It is a quiet neighborhood with streets lined with antique Ottoman wooden houses.

Kuzguncuk is bordered on the north by Beylerbeyi, on the east by Burhaniye, on the south by İcadiye and Sultantepe, and on the west by the Bosphorus. On the other side of the Bosphorus is Beşiktaş. The Otoyol 1  highway separates the neighborhood from Burhaniye.

History

The word kuzguncuk means "little raven" or "barred window of a prison door" in Turkish. The name is said to have come from a holy person named Kuzgun Baba, who lived in the area during the time of Sultan Mehmet II or from the corruption of a previous name, Kozinitza.

During Byzantine times, this area may have been called Khrysokeramos (Hrisokeramos), meaning "golden tile", because of a church here with a gilded roof. Around 553, Narses had a church built here dedicated to the Virgin Mary.

Jews, who were expelled from Spain and Portugal and accepted into the Ottoman Empire in the late 15th century were among the settlers in the neighbourhood. As voluntary immigrants, they had more freedom concerning their place of residence, and many left the traditional Jewish quarters of Istanbul such as Balat for villages along the Bosphorus such as Kuzguncuk. The earliest evidence of Jewish presence in the neighborhood is a tombstone dated 1562.

Armenians began settling in Kuzguncuk in the 18th century and had become a sizable group by the 19th century. Ottoman records show an 1834 request that their nighttime religious services be allowed to continue without interference. In 1835, their first church was built.

After the establishment of Israel, the Jewish population, once sizable in Kuzguncuk, decreased rapidly.

The pogrom of 1955 caused the emigration of many members of Istanbul's minority groups, including Kuzguncuk's Greeks and Armenians. There are very few non-Muslims left today. This exodus opened up housing to migrants from Anatolia, changing the ethnic composition of Istanbul's neighborhoods. Most of the new residents of Kuzguncuk came from the Black Sea Region. By the end of the 20th century, 15% of neighborhood residents were from İnebolu, 15% from Rize, 10% from Trabzon, 10% from Tokat, 10% from Kars, and 10% from Sivas.

There is very few crime in the neighbourhood, the police station in Kuzguncuk was moved due to low crime statistics.

Religious sites
There are currently two synagogues in Kuzguncuk: Bet Yaakov Synagogue (built 1878) and Bet Nissim Synagogue (built in the 1840s). The Nakkaştepe Jewish Cemetery is also in Kuzguncuk.

There was no mosque in the center of the neighborhood until 1952, when the Kuzguncuk Mosque was built in the courtyard of the Armenian church (with building funds that included donations from the Armenian congregation).

Film set
The place with its historical mansions, churches, synagogues and mosques, cobblestone paved streets, plane trees and vegetable gardens, attracts film makers as a natural film set. Since the shooting of the popular TV comedy series Perihan Abla in the mid-1990s, Kuzguncuk became a favorite film set for several other TV series and commercials. The residents, however, are not pleased with the continuous discomfort caused by the shootings day and night.

Restaurants
Kuzguncuk is popular for its seafood restaurants. Ismet Baba Fish Restaurant and Kosinitza Restaurant are two to name a few.

Notable people
 Mehmet Ali Aybar (1908-1995), leader of the banned Workers Party of Turkey (TİP)
 Refika Birgül (born 1980), food writer and television presenter
 Hülya Koçyiğit (born 1947), movie actress
 Palaiologos, Pavlos (1895-1984), journalist, writer
 Oktay Rıfat Horozcu (1914-1988), writer, playwright and poet
 Nihat Sargın, secretary general of the banned Workers Party of Turkey (TİP)
 Can Yücel (1926-1999), poet
 Uğur Yücel (born 1957), actor, film director and producer

See also

 Aliyah

References

 Ecumenical Patriarchate. Church of Saint Panteleimon Kouzkountzoukiou. http://www.ec-patr.org/afieroma/churches/show.php?lang=en&id=49 Retrieved 14 September 2009.
 Ecumenical Patriarchate. Holy Metropolises in Turkey. http://www.ec-patr.org/patrdisplay.php?lang=en&id=4 Retrieved 14 September 2009.
 Ercan, Şerif. (2004, 13 November) "Kuzguncuk Semttir Set Değil" (Kuzguncuk is a neighborhood, not a film set). Sabah (newspaper). http://arsiv.sabah.com.tr/2004/11/13/cpsabah/gnc105-20041030-101.html Retrieved 12 September 2009. 

 

 Internet Movie Database. Aci Hayat. https://www.imdb.com/title/tt0499168/ Retrieved 12 September 2009.

 Tabakoğlu, Ahmet. (2007, 1–5 November).  Osmanlı  Döneminde Üsküdar Köyleri (Üsküdar villages in the Ottoman period). Paper presented at Üsküdar Sempozyumu V. https://web.archive.org/web/20111006122806/http://www.uskudar.bel.tr/portal/doc/sempozyum/sempozyum5/T11.pdf Retrieved 19 September 2009.
 
 Türkiye Hahambaşılığı (Chief Rabbinate of Turkey). (2005) Synagogues: Asian Side of the Bosphorus. https://web.archive.org/web/20110714133716/http://www.musevicemaati.com/index.php?contentId=27 Retrieved 14 August 2009.
 Üsküdar Belediyesi (Üsküdar Municipality). Cemil Molla Köşkü (Mullah Cemil pavilion). https://web.archive.org/web/20110722000709/http://www.uskudar-bld.gov.tr/portal/rehber_/t1.jsp?PageName=rehberAyrinti&ID=772 Retrieved 20 September 2009. 
 Üsküdar Belediyesi (Üsküdar Municipality). Kuzguncuk Mahallesi (Kuzguncuk neighborhood). https://web.archive.org/web/20111006122541/http://www.uskudar.bel.tr/portal/uskudar_/t1.jsp?PageName=mahalletarihceAyr&ID=26 Retrieved 12 September 2009.
 :elΠαύλος_Παλαιολόγος

External links:  

 Map of Kuzguncuk neighborhood
 Images of Nakkaştepe and Kuzguncuk

Neighbourhoods of Üsküdar
Bosphorus
Jewish communities in Turkey
Jews and Judaism in Istanbul